Ameletus is a genus of mayfly and the type genus of the family Ameletidae.

Taxonomic history
Ameletus was circumscribed by Rev. A. E. Eaton in 1885. His initial circumscription included three species, all of which were described in the same paper: the type species A. dissitus, A. subnotatus, and A. exquisitus.

R. P. Longinus Navás circumscribed the genus Chimura in 1915. It only consisted of its type species, the newly described C. aetherea. In 1960, Edmunds synonymized Chimura with Ameletus.

Paleoameletus was circumscribed by J. A. Lestage in 1940; he created it for the species A. primitivus which J. R. Traver had described the previous year. George F. Edmunds, Jr., and Jay R. Traver synonymized Paleoameletus with Ameletus in 1954.

Species
Ameletus species include:

 A. amador 
 A. andersoni 
 A. bellulus 
 A. browni 
 A. celer 
 A. cooki 
 A. cryptostimulus 
 A. dissitus 
 A. doddsianus 
 A. edmundsi 
 A. exquisitus 
 A. falsus 
 A. imbellis 
 A. inopinatus 
 A. lineatus 
 A. ludens 
 A. majusculus 
 A. minimus 
 A. oregonensis 
 A. oregonensis 
 A. quadratus 
 A. shepherdi 
 A. similior 
 A. sparsatus 
 A. subnotatus 
 A. suffusus 
 A. tarteri 
 A. tertius 
 A. tolae 
 A. validus 
 A. vancouverensis 
 A. velox 
 A. vernalis 
 A. walleyi

References

Mayfly genera
Mayflies